The Diocese of Tagum (Latin: Dioecesis Tagamna) is a diocese of the Catholic Church in the Philippines.

The diocese is a suffragan of the Archdiocese of Davao. It was canonically erected as Prelature Nullius on 13 January 1962 by Pope John XXIII, with Joseph Regan M.M. as its local ordinary. It was elevated to the status of a diocese on 11 October 1980 by Pope John Paul II, who appointed Pedro Dean as its first Filipino bishop ordinary, and Ramon Villena as the auxiliary bishop.

The diocesan territory comprises the entire civil provinces of Davao del Norte (except the city of Samal, the southern portion of the Lasang River) and Davao de Oro.

Religious Institute of Men
At the moment there is only one religious institute of men present in the diocese. These are the missionary priests who operate a school in Tagum City. They are called Congregation of the Schools of Charity "Cavanis Fathers" (CSCH) which is housed at Letran de Davao High School, Seminary Drive, Tagum City.

Religious Institutes of Women
Handmaids of Christ the King (ACR)
Daughters of Mary of the Assumption (FMA)
Dominican Sisters of the Most Holy Rosary of the Philippines (OP)
Dominican Sisters of Regina Rosary (OP-Regina)
Dominican Sisters of the Trinity (OP)
Order of the Most Holy Savior of Saint Bridget (OSsS)
Religious of the Virgin Mary (RVM)
Teresian Daughters of Mary (TDM)

Bishops

Ordinaries

Auxiliary Bishops

See also
Catholic Church in the Philippines

References

Tagum
Tagum
Tagum
Christian organizations established in 1962
Roman Catholic dioceses and prelatures established in the 20th century
Religion in Davao del Norte